The following lists events that happened during 1987 in Laos.

Incumbents
President: Souphanouvong 
Prime Minister: Kaysone Phomvihane

Events

December
December - The Thai–Laotian Border War begins.

Births
3 March - Sawatvilay Phimmasone, taekwondo practitioner
8 April - Kitsada Thongkhen, footballer
30 April - Philaylack Sackpraseuth,  athlete
1 June - Sengphachan Bounthisanh, footballer
23 July - Kovanh Namthavixay, footballer
28 October - Saynakhonevieng Phommapanya, footballer

References

 
Years of the 20th century in Laos
Laos
1980s in Laos
Laos